The 2002 Iraqi Perseverance Cup was the 7th edition of the Iraqi Super Cup. The match was contested between Baghdad rivals Al-Talaba and Al-Quwa Al-Jawiya at Al-Shaab Stadium in Baghdad. It was played on 30 August 2002 as a curtain-raiser to the 2002–03 season. Al-Talaba won their first Super Cup title, winning the match 2–1 after  golden goal extra time. Both of Al-Talaba's goals were free-kicks scored by Fawzi Abdul-Sada.

Match

Details

References

External links
 Iraq Football Association

Football competitions in Iraq
2002–03 in Iraqi football
Iraqi Super Cup